David Knight (born 21 August 1956) is an Australian former cricketer. He played one first-class cricket match for Victoria in 1978.

See also
 List of Victoria first-class cricketers

References

External links
 

1956 births
Living people
Australian cricketers
Victoria cricketers
Cricketers from Melbourne